Well Meaning Fiction is the first full-length studio album by the Christian rock band Mainstay.

Track listing
"These Pages" 
"Mirrors" 
"Yesterday" 
"This Could Be" 
"Overnight on Nicollet" 
"Take Away" 
"Danger" 
"Well Meaning Fiction" 
"October Came Late " 
"Down Silver Lake" 
"Take Away (reprise)"

Personnel
 Justin Anderson – lead vocals, guitar
 Scott Campbell – guitar
 Dan Ostebo – bass guitar
 Ryan DeYounge – drums

References

2006 albums
Mainstay albums